William P. Rogers (1913–2001) was Attorney General of the United States. Attorney General Rogers may also refer to:

Byron G. Rogers (1900–1983), Attorney General of Colorado
Horatio Rogers Jr. (1836–1904), Attorney General of Rhode Island
John Rogers (Irish lawyer) (born 1947), Attorney General of Ireland
Nancy H. Rogers (born 1948), Attorney General of Ohio
Sion Hart Rogers (1825–1874), Attorney General of North Carolina

See also
General Rogers (disambiguation)